Maragallu (also Romanized as Marāgallū, Maragallow, and Maregallū) is a village in Majdabad Rural District, in the Central District of Marvdasht County, Fars Province, Iran. At the 2006 census, its population was 1,582, in 380 families.

References 

Populated places in Marvdasht County